Egyptian Second Division 2008–09 is the 2008–09 season of the Egyptian Second Division competition. A total of 48 teams are divided into 3 groups based on geographical distribution. The top team of each group promotes to the highest Egyptian football level; Egyptian Premier League.

Teams Promoted and Relegated before 2008-09 Egyptian Second Division

Teams Relegated from 2007-08 Egyptian Premier Division 
14th (Group A)

  Baladeyet El-Mahalla 15th (Group C)
  Suez Cement 16th (Group B)

Teams Promoted from 2007-08 Egyptian Third Division

Teams Promoted and Relegated after 2008-09 Egyptian Second Division

Teams Promoted to 2009-10 Egyptian Premier League 
  El Gouna FC won the Egyptian Second Division 2008-09 (Group A)
  El-Entag El-Harby won the Egyptian Second Division 2008-09 (Group B)
  El Mansoura SC won the Egyptian Second Division 2008-09 (Group C)

Teams Relegated to 2009-10 Egyptian Third Division 

Group A
  Bani Suweif FC
  Quos FC
  El Badri FC

Group B
  Ghazl El Suez FC
  Misr Insurance FC
  Mnouf FC

Group C
  Domiat Club
  El Henawy FC
  Talkha Electricity FC

League tables

Group A 

Top 3 teams qualify for the 2009–10 Egyptian Premier League.
Bottom 3 teams are relegated to the Egyptian Third Division for the 2009–10 season.

Group B 

Top 3 teams qualify for the 2009–10 Egyptian Premier League.
Bottom 3 teams are relegated to the Egyptian Third Division for the 2009–10 season.

Group C 

Top 3 teams qualify for the 2009–10 Egyptian Premier League.
Bottom 3 teams are relegated to the Egyptian Third Division for the 2009–10 season.

References

External links
The Egyptian Second Division Table 2008-09 Season
RSSSF Second Level 2008/09
all about Egyptian football
All About Egyptian Players
Best site about Egyptian Football
RSSSF competition history
Egyptian Premier League schedule, match results, and match downloads
Filgoal.com Egyptian Premier League Live And It is very fast scoreboard

Egyptian Second Division seasons
2008–09 in Egyptian football
Egypt